Ilulissat Icefjord is a fjord in western Greenland. Located 250 km north of the Arctic Circle, the Ilulissat Icefjord runs west  from the Greenland ice sheet to Disko Bay just south of Ilulissat town. Ilulissat Icefjord was declared a UNESCO World Heritage Site in 2004 because of its natural beauty and the importance of the fast-moving Jakobshavn Glacier in developing the current scientific understanding of anthropogenic climate change. 
{ "type": "ExternalData", "service": "geoshape", "ids": "Q828071", "properties": { "fill": "#0050d0"}}

Geography 

The fjord contains the Jakobshavn Glacier, the most productive glacier in the Northern Hemisphere.

Icebergs breaking from the glacier are often so large —up to a kilometer (3,300 ft) in height— that they are too tall to float down the fjord and lie stuck on the bottom of its shallower areas, sometimes for years, until they are broken up by the force of the glacier and icebergs further up the fjord. On breaking up the icebergs emerge into the open sea and initially travel north with ocean currents before turning south and running into the Atlantic Ocean. Larger icebergs typically do not melt until they reach 40-45 degrees north —further south than the United Kingdom and level with New York City.

See also 
List of fjords of Greenland

References

Bibliography 
Ilulissat Icefjord. Book edited by Ole Bennike, Naja Mikkelsen, Greg McCollum, Henrik Klinge Pedersen and Anker Weidick, Geological Survey of Denmark and Greenland, 28 September 2004,

External links 

NASA study: Fastest Glacier in Greenland Doubles Speed
Ilulissat Icefjord UNESCO Website

Ilulissat
Disko Bay
Fjords of Greenland
World Heritage Sites in Greenland
World Heritage Sites in Denmark

simple:Ilulissat#Ilulissat ice fjord